Cid Moreira (born 29 September 1927) is a Brazilian journalist and TV anchor, active since 1947. He was born in Taubaté, São Paulo, and is most recognized for his work as the main anchor on Rede Globo's primetime news program Jornal Nacional between 1969 and 1996. He is widely known by his grave, resonating voice. Moreira is also a narrator, having recorded several audiobook versions of Biblical works.

References

1927 births
Living people
People from Taubaté
Brazilian television news anchors
Brazilian voice actors
Brazilian Seventh-day Adventists